Pereborovo is a rural locality (a selo) in Pavlovskoye Rural Settlement, Suzdalsky District, Vladimir Oblast, Russia. The population was 62 as of 2010. There are 6 streets.

Geography 
Pereborovo is located on the right bank of the Nerl River, 15 km southeast of Suzdal (the district's administrative centre) by road. Babarino is the nearest rural locality.

References 

Rural localities in Suzdalsky District